Tamara-Anna Cislowska is an Australian concert pianist. She has performed across many countries, including the United States, United Kingdom, South America, Italy, Japan, Germany, Switzerland, Greece, The Netherlands and Poland, and has played with the Philharmonia, the London Philharmonic and Romanian Philharmonic orchestras as well as all six major Australian symphony orchestras.

Career
Cislowska was taught the rudiments of the piano by her mother, Neta Maughan. She emerged as a child prodigy, giving her first public performance at age two. She began recording material for ABC Radio at three years of age. One of her first mentors was Nancy Salas, and she later studied with Geoffrey Tozer. She won the most prizes of the McDonalds Sydney Performing Arts Challenge over three categories; instrumental, speech and drama, singing. She won the 1991 ABC Symphony Australia Young Performers Awards, Australia's most prestigious classical music award, at the age of 14, becoming the youngest pianist ever to do so. A year later she was sent to Sydney's sister cities on a tour as a cultural ambassador, visiting Nagoya, Wellington and San Francisco. Cislowska was a founding member of the Australian Young Performers Trio, St Laurence Trio, Mozart Piano Quartet (Berlin) and Australia Piano Quartet.

She has received a number of awards and honours for her work and has been a major prizewinner at several international piano competitions, including the Rovere d'Oro, Maria Callas and National World Power. She is the winner of the David Paul Landa Memorial Award for Pianists and is a Freedman Fellow. She has an APRA award for Best Performance ACT. Her work has received six nominations for ARIA awards for Best Classical Release.

Cislowska's recordings include five solo albums on the Artworks label, including The Enchanted Isle, The Persian Hours and The Russians. She has recorded for Naxos, Chandos, Dabringhaus and Grimm, ABC Classics, and Deutsche Grammophon. She has contributed to albums with the Sydney Symphony Orchestra, the New Zealand Symphony Orchestra and the London Philharmonic Orchestra.

As a recitalist she has performed at the Purcell Room in London, the Concert Hall of the Sydney Opera House, the Kleine Zaal of the Concertgebouw in Amsterdam and in New York at the Frick Collection and Carnegie Hall. At the ARIA Music Awards of 2015 Cislowska won Best Classical Album for Peter Sculthorpe: Complete Works for Solo Piano.

On Australian ABC Classic radio, Cislowska hosts the weekly program Duet, described as an hour of music and conversation at the keyboard.

Family
Her mother, Neta Maughan, is an accomplished piano teacher.

Discography

Albums

Awards and nominations

ARIA Music Awards
The ARIA Music Awards is an annual awards ceremony that recognises excellence, innovation, and achievement across all genres of Australian music. They commenced in 1987.

! 
|-
| 1997
| The Enchanted Isle
|rowspan="7" | Best Classical Album
| 
|rowspan="6" | 
|-
| 1998
| The Persian Hours
| 
|-
| 1999
| Piano: The Russian Album
| 
|-
| 2015
| Peter Sculthorpe: Complete Works for Solo Piano
| 
|-
| 2017
| Elena Kats-Chernin: Unsent Love Letters – Meditations on Erik Satie
| 
|-
| 2018
| Into Silence: Part Vasks Gorecki Pelecis (with Tasmanian Symphony Orchestra & Johannes Fritzsch)
| 
|-
| 2022
|  Duet
| 
| 
|-

References

External links
 
Profile, Shupp Artists Management

Year of birth missing (living people)
Living people
ARIA Award winners
Australian people of Polish descent
Australian classical pianists
Australian women pianists
Date of birth missing (living people)
Place of birth missing (living people)
21st-century classical pianists
21st-century women pianists